The Thandikulam–Omanthai offensive was a battle for the control of the towns of Thandikulam and Omanthai in Sri Lanka in June 1997.

Battle

The battle began on June 10, 1997, when LTTE fighters attacked the garrison at Thandikulam. They destroyed the bridge on the edge of town so no reinforcements could arrive. While the fighting was raging an arms dump was hit by a rocket, causing a huge explosion that resulted in many casualties. Another dump was also hit shortly after and caused the same result. Helicopter gunships were sent to try to assist the besieged soldiers, but one of them was badly damaged. Finally the city fell and the Tigers held it for two days, taking everything they could.

The LTTE attacked the town of Omanthai 13 days later. To get to Omanthai they had to go through Periyamadu, where 250 Sri Lankan soldiers were stationed. As the Tigers attacked, all of the soldiers deserted their bunkers and left a gap over 1 km long in the camp's perimeter. The Tigers took full advantage of the gap by swarming into Periyamadu and pushing their way deeper and deeper into SLA territory. Within minutes the Tigers had reached the main military base at Omanthai and headed straight for the artillery cannons. In heavy hand-to-hand combat, the Tigers took Omanthai, capturing six artillery pieces as well as several armoured vehicles.

See also
 List of Sri Lankan Civil War battles
 Operation Jayasikurui
 Battle of Mullaitivu
 Oddusuddan offensive

References

Battles of Eelam War III
Conflicts in 1997
1997 in Sri Lanka
June 1997 events in Asia
Omanthai